The 1990 Monte Carlo Open, also known by its sponsored name Volvo Monte Carlo Open, was a men's tennis tournament played on outdoor clay courts. It was the 84th edition of the Monte Carlo Open, and was part of the ATP Championship Series, Single-Week of the 1990 ATP Tour. It took place at the Monte Carlo Country Club in Roquebrune-Cap-Martin, France, near Monte Carlo, Monaco, 23 April until 29 April 1990. The men's field was headlined by Stefan Edberg and Boris Becker. Andrei Chesnokov, who was seeded 12th, won the singles title.

Finals

Singles

 Andrei Chesnokov defeated  Thomas Muster 7–5, 6–3, 6–3
 It was Chesnokov's 1st singles title of the year and his 5th overall. It was his 1st Masters title.

Doubles

 Petr Korda /  Tomáš Šmíd defeated  Andrés Gómez /  Javier Sánchez 6–4, 7–6

References

External links
 
 ATP tournament profile
 ITF tournament edition details

 
Monte-Carlo Masters
1990 in Monégasque sport
Monte